The 1887–88 season was the 17th season of competitive football in England.

National team
England won the 1888 British Home Championship, their first victory in the tournament, with comfortable victories over all three other home nations, in each of which England scored five goals.

Albert Allen, of Aston Villa, scored three goals against Ireland in his only appearance for England.

* England score given first

Key
 H = Home match
 A = Away match
 BHC = British Home Championship

Honours

Notes = Number in parentheses is the times that club has won that honour. * indicates new record for competition

References